Edward Ho Sing-tin, SBS, OBE, JP, FHKIA (born 1938) is a Hong Kong politician and architect.

Section
He has served as:
 Hong Kong Institute of Architects, President (1983–84)
 Board of Hong Kong Industrial Estates Corporation, Chairman (1992–2001)
 Accreditation Panel on the Hong Kong Academy for Performing Arts (1988), member
 Hong Kong Basic Law Consultative Committee member (1985–89)
 Legislative Council member (1987–2000);
 Executive Council member (1991–92)

He is an independent non-executive director and member of the Board of the MTR Corporation (since 1991). He was a founding member of the Liberal Party of Hong Kong, and one of the longest-serving Legislative Council members. 

He was appointed to the General Committee of the Hong Kong Philharmonic Society, whose Chief Executive re-appointed Ho as Chairman of the General Committee of the HKPS from 1 November 2005 to 31 October 2006.

References

External links
 Member of the Legislative Council – Hon HO Sing-tin, Edward, SBS, JP
LCSD website
GLD website
Growing with Hong Kong: the University and its graduates: the first 90 years; published by the University of Hong Kong, page 153

1938 births
Living people
Hong Kong architects
Recipients of the Silver Bauhinia Star
Officers of the Order of the British Empire
Liberal Party (Hong Kong) politicians
Business and Professionals Federation of Hong Kong politicians
Members of the Executive Council of Hong Kong
Progressive Hong Kong Society politicians
Members of the Provisional Legislative Council
HK LegCo Members 1985–1988
HK LegCo Members 1988–1991
HK LegCo Members 1991–1995
HK LegCo Members 1995–1997
HK LegCo Members 1998–2000
Hong Kong Basic Law Consultative Committee members
Members of the Selection Committee of Hong Kong
Members of the Election Committee of Hong Kong, 1998–2000
Members of the Election Committee of Hong Kong, 2000–2005
Members of the Election Committee of Hong Kong, 2007–2012
Members of the Election Committee of Hong Kong, 2012–2017